is a railway station in the city of Morioka, Iwate Prefecture, Japan, operated by East Japan Railway Company (JR East).

Lines
Senbokuchō Station is served by the Tōhoku Main Line, and is located 533.5 rail kilometers from the terminus of the line at Tokyo Station.

Station layout
The station has a single island platform connected to the station building by a footbridge.  The station has a Midori no Madoguchi staffed ticket office.

Platforms

History
Senbokuchō Station was opened on 5 January 1915. The station was absorbed into the JR East network upon the privatization of the Japanese National Railways (JNR) on 1 April 1987.

Passenger statistics
In fiscal 2018, the station was used by an average of 1,687 passengers daily (boarding passengers only).

See also
 List of Railway Stations in Japan

References

External links
 

Railway stations in Iwate Prefecture
Tōhoku Main Line
Railway stations in Japan opened in 1915
Morioka, Iwate
Stations of East Japan Railway Company